EB, Eb, or E may refer to:

Arts, entertainment, and media
 E-flat (disambiguation) (the note "E" and related items)
 Eat Bulaga!, a long-running variety show in the Philippines
  Eb Dawson, a fictional character of the TV series Green Acres 
 Encyclopædia Britannica, a general knowledge English-language encyclopaedia
 Europa Barbarorum, a modification of the computer game Rome: Total War

Brands and enterprises
 EB (beer), Polish beer
 "EB", the maker's mark on clay pipes manufactured by Eduard Bird
 EB, the logo of the French car manufacturer Bugatti, based on the symbols of its founder, Ettore Bugatti
 EB, the symbol listed on the NYSE (New York Stock Exchange) for Eventbrite, Inc.
 EB Games, formerly known as Electronics Boutique, a computer and video games retailer
 Eggland's Best, a product of Cal-Maine
 Elektrisk Bureau, a Norwegian electrical equipment manufacturer
 Elektrobit, a Finnish company in the wireless and automotive business
 Energizer Bunny, mascot of Energizer

Science and technology
 Embryoid body, a structure adopted by stem cells during their differentiation in suspension
 Epidermolysis bullosa, a rare genetic disease
 Epstein–Barr virus, one of the most common viruses in humans
 Exabit (Eb), a unit of information used, for example, to quantify computer memory or storage capacity
 Exabyte (EB), a unit of information used, for example, to quantify computer memory or storage capacity

Other uses
 EB (train), a cabless second unit of an EMD EA/EB diesel locomotive
 Bureau of Economic and Business Affairs, in the U.S. Department of State
 EB/Streymur, a Faroese football team
 European Baccalaureate, a degree given on completion of the last year of attendance at the European School
 E. B. Farnum, one of the first residents of Deadwood, South Dakota, owner of the Grand Central Hotel, and the town's first mayor; on the HBO television series Deadwood and Deadwood: The Movie, his character is referred to as "E.B."